Halfbreed (sometimes known as Half-Breed) is a memoir by Maria Campbell, published by McClelland and Stewart in 1973. The book details Campbell's life growing up Métis in Saskatchewan.

The memoir has gone though several reprints, re-published most recently in 2019. This latest edition including a previously removed chapter, which detailed Campbell being sexually assaulted by an RCMP officer.

An adaptation of the book by Berkley Brady, the director of the 2022 Canadian horror film Dark Nature, is in the works.

References 

1973 non-fiction books
Canadian memoirs
McClelland & Stewart books
Non-fiction books about indigenous peoples of the Americas